Turkeyhen Run (also called Turkey Hen Creek) is a stream entirely within Washington County, Ohio.

Turkeyhen Run was so named by a group of hunters from Virginia, who to their dismay, caught only a turkey hen.

See also
List of rivers of Ohio

References

Rivers of Washington County, Ohio
Rivers of Ohio